Henry St. John Thackeray (1869–30 June 1930) was a British biblical scholar at King's College, Cambridge, an expert on Koine Greek, Josephus and the Septuagint.

Henry Thackeray was a scholar of King's College, University of Cambridge, who is perhaps best remembered for his work on Josephus, for his Grammar of Old Testament Greek and for his translation of Friedrich Blass' Grammar of New Testament Greek.

His untimely death at the age of sixty-one in 1930 abruptly ended his work as editor and translator of Josephus's works for the Loeb Classical Library, after producing the first four volumes, and preparing part of the fifth, of a projected series of nine volumes. The work was then carried on by the American scholar, Ralph Marcus, and after him by Allen Wikgren and lastly Louis Feldman.
 
A son was the astronomer A. David Thackeray.

Selected works

 
 The Letter of Aristeas Introduction and Greek Text, as an appendix in

External links
 

1869 births
1930 deaths
British biblical scholars
Grammarians of Ancient Greek
Fellows of King's College, Cambridge